Football is the most popular sport in Turkmenistan, a country that gained independence in 1991. The national association regularly takes part in competitions organised by FIFA and the AFC at senior and youth level. Valeri Nepomniachi is probably the most famous name in Turkmen football. He was the coach who led Cameroon to the 1990 FIFA World Cup in Italy. The Africans surprised many with their 1–0 win over defending champions Argentina in the opening match and finally bowed out in the quarter-finals.
There are 40 clubs, 820 players, and 30 referees in the country. The major stadiums are: Köpetdag Stadium, Nabitchi (Nebitdag, 15,000 seats), and The Builder (Ashgabat, 11,000 seats).

History of football in Turkmenistan

Soviet period
Football in Turkmenistan started to develop in the 1920s, however the sport became more organised when in 1937 the first championship of the Turkmen SSR was held. From 1937 until 1991, the most successful clubs were Neftyanik Kvasnovodsk and Pogranichnik Ashkhabad having won each six Turkmen SSR Championship Titles.

Even though no team from the Turkmen SSR ever played in the Soviet Top League, several footballers did, of whom most notably are Valeri Broshin, Kurban Berdyev, Sergey Agashkov, Ravshan Muhadov, Dmitri Khomukha, Charyar Mukhadov and Vitaliy Kafanov.

The following Turkmenistani footballers had been members of USSR national football team:

Since independence
Following independence from the Soviet Union, Football Association of Turkmenistan was established in 1992, and has been a member of FIFA and AFC since 1994. The Ýokary Liga and Turkmenistan Cup were reestablished in 1992. Since 1995, Turkmenistan has hosted the annual international football tournament known as Turkmenistan President's Cup. Turkmenistani clubs also participate in the annual CIS Cup.

The Turkmenistan national football team success came in 1993, when it became runners up in the 1993 ECO Cup losing 2–1 to the host nation Iran. More success followed when the team reached the quarter-finals stage of the 1994 Asian Games. Ten years later, the national team qualified for its only appearance in the continental tournament the 2004 AFC Asian Cup, then came close again for qualifying when reached the final of the 2010 AFC Challenge Cup losing to North Korea eventual champions in penalty shootouts.

The most well known Turkmenistani football personalities are Kurban Berdyev (head coach of Rubin Kazan, Champions of the Russian Premier League in 2008 and 2009) and Ashgabat-born Rolan Gusev (Russian national team footballer 2000-2005).

In March 2019,  the Football Federation of Turkmenistan named Croatian Ante Miše as the head coach of the Turkmenistan national football team, signing a one-year contract. Croatian specialist Sandro Tomić will help to train the national team of Turkmenistan. Croatian coaches are set to develop the overall football in Turkmenistan, not just the national team.

League system

Turkmenistan football stadiums

References